Limneria is a genus of small sea snails, marine gastropod mollusks in the family Velutinidae.

Species
Species within the genus Limneria include:
Limneria insculpta Odhner, 1913
Limneria prolongata (Carpenter, 1864)
Limneria undata (T. Brown, 1839)

References

External links
 Hägg R. (1904-1905). Mollusca und Brachiopoda gesammelt von der schwedischen Polarexpedition nach Spitzbergen, dem nordöstlichen Grönland und Jan Mayen im Jahre 1900. Arkiv for Zoologi, 2(2): 1-66 (1904); 2(13): 1-136 (1905) 

Velutinidae